Together Again for the First Time is a 2001 album by the punk rock band Pulley. It was the band's first album to be released after Scott Radinsky's pitching career ended.

Track listing
  "In Search"  – 2:11
  "Hooray For Me"  – 2:18
  "History Repeats Itself"  – 2:28
  "Fuel"  – 2:12
  "Empty"  – 2:42
  "Lost Trip"  – 2:29
  "Touched"  – 2:57
  "Runaway"  – 2:50
  "The Ocean Song"  – 2:56
  "Destiny"  – 0:19
  "Leather Face"  – 1:40
  "Same Sick Feeling"  – 2:01
  "Silenced"  – 2:51

References

Pulley (band) albums
2001 albums
Albums produced by Ryan Greene